Han Hong (dates unknown, but fl. 8th century) was a Chinese poet of the mid-Tang period. His courtesy name was Junping.

He hailed from Nanyang, and attained a jinshi degree in the imperial examination in 754, and served in several government positions. His poetry was praised by the emperor. He was included among of the "Ten Talents of the Dali Reign", and three of his poems were included in the Three Hundred Tang Poems. Books 243, 244 and 245 of the Quan Tangshi are devoted to his poetry.

Biography 
The year of his birth is not known, but he came from Nanyang (modern-day Xiuwu County, Henan Province). He attained a jinshi degree in the imperial examination in 754, and worked in various government positions including jia bu lang jung zhi zhi gao and zhong shu she ren.

Poetry 
He was one of the "Ten Talents of the Dali Reign". Three of his poems were included in the Three Hundred Tang Poems. A Ming-era editor compiled an anthology of his poetry called the Han Junping Ji.

He had a strong linguistic sense and used simple vocabulary to produce highly evocative poetry. One example cited by Ueki et al. is the first part of his poem "Han Shi", which describes the capital during the Cold Food Festival, and was strongly appreciated by Emperor Dezong of Tang:

Another good example cited by Ueki et al. is the following passage from a lüshi which he sent to an associate:

This passage was highly praised by later Song Dynasty critics as an example of a farewell poem.

Portrayals in later literature 
He was featured as the protagonist in Xu Yaozuo's romantic novel .

References

Works cited

External links 
Books of the Quan Tangshi that include collected poems of Han Hong at the Chinese Text Project:
Book 243
Book 244
Book 245

8th-century Chinese poets
Year of birth unknown
Year of death unknown
Poets from Henan
Politicians from Nanyang, Henan
Tang dynasty politicians from Henan
Three Hundred Tang Poems poets
Writers from Nanyang, Henan